Geraint Wyn Howells, Baron Geraint (15 April 1925 – 17 April 2004) was a leading Welsh Liberal Democrat politician. 
Howells was born in Ponterwyd in Cardiganshire. He was the son of David John and Mary Blodwen Howells, both farmers.

Education

Howells was educated at Ponterwyd Primary School and Ardwyn Grammar School, Aberystwyth. During his parliamentary career Howells also retained close links with Aberystwyth and Lampeter universities.

Pre-parliamentary career

Howells' main living was as a hill farmer in Glennydd, Ponterwyd in Ceredgion. He held some 750 acres there with around 3,000 sheep. The majority were prize winning Speckled Faces. Howells was also a champion sheep shearer. He held senior positions in the British Wool Marketing Board and was also chairman of the Wool Producers of Wales, 1977–1983. Politically, Howells was elected to Cardiganshire County Council as an Independent in 1952, defeating the sitting member by twelve votes. At this time it was normal practice in Welsh rural counties for Liberal members to stand as independents.

However, in 1958 he was briefly appointed as agent for the prospective Labour candidate for Cardiganshire, Loti Rees Hughes.

Parliamentary career
Howells was selected as the parliamentary candidate for Brecon and Radnor in 1968. He was the first Liberal to contest the seat in the post-war period. He came third with 18.9 per cent of the vote. During this period Howells became one of the central players in the Welsh Liberal Party.

In 1972 Howells was selected as the parliamentary candidate for Cardiganshire, a seat with a longstanding Liberal tradition. It had been held by the Liberal MP, Roderic Bowen, until his defeat by Labour's Elystan Morgan in 1966. In the February 1974 general election Howells defeated Morgan and retained the constituency in several different forms until 1992. Thus he was Member of Parliament (MP) for Cardigan (1974–1983) and Ceredigion and Pembroke North (1983–1992) after boundary changes. Howells was the Liberal Party's spokesman on Welsh Affairs (1979–1987) and agriculture (1987–92). His Westminster secretary and agent was Judi Lewis (Welsh Liberal Democrat chief executive 1992–1997) whilst one of his researchers was Mark Williams who would later win the seat for the Liberal Democrats in 2005.

In 1992, Howells unexpectedly lost his seat to Plaid Cymru (which moved from fourth place to first). Plaid Cymru had formed an alliance with the Wales Green Party which attracted considerable support from non-Welsh speakers in the constituency. Howells was made a life peer as Baron Geraint, of Ponterwyd in the County of Dyfed. Howells was a close friend of both Richard Livsey and Emlyn Hooson, both of whom he served with at Westminster in the House of Commons and the House of Lords.

Howells was a passionate pro-devolutionist. He played a lead role in the 1979 devolution campaign in Wales. He was also able to get the Farmers Union of Wales (FUW) recognition as one of the official unions for government negotiations during the Lib-Lab pact on the 1970s.

Personal life

Geraint Howells married Mary Olwen Hughes on 7 September 1957. They had two children: Gaenor, a newsreader with the BBC World Service, born in 1961 and Mari born in 1965.

References

Brack, Duncan, ed Dictionary of Liberal Biography, 1998

Sources

External links

1925 births
2004 deaths
Liberal Party (UK) MPs for Welsh constituencies
Geraint
Liberal Democrats (UK) MPs for Welsh constituencies
Members of Cardiganshire County Council
UK MPs 1974
UK MPs 1974–1979
UK MPs 1979–1983
UK MPs 1983–1987
UK MPs 1987–1992
Welsh-speaking politicians
People educated at Ardwyn School, Aberystwyth
Members of the Parliament of the United Kingdom for Ceredigion
Sheep shearers
Life peers created by Elizabeth II